The 1949 European Amateur Boxing Championships were held in Oslo, Norway from 13 to 18 June. It was the eighth edition of the bi-annual competition was organised by the European governing body for amateur boxing, EABA. There were 93 fighters from 16 countries participating.

Medal winners

Medal table

References

External links
Results
EABA Boxing

European Amateur Boxing Championships
Boxing
European Amateur Boxing Championships
Boxing Championships 1949
European Amateur Boxing Championships
International sports competitions in Oslo
1940s in Oslo